The 18th Annual British Academy Television Craft Awards were presented by the British Academy of Film and Television Arts (BAFTA) on 23 April 2017. For the fifth consecutive year, Stephen Mangan was the ceremony's host. The awards were held at The Brewery, City of London, and given in recognition of technical achievements in British television of 2016. Planet Earth II led the nominations with nine. The Crown, Planet Earth II, National Treasure and The Night Manager won two awards each.

Winners and nominees
Winners are listed first and highlighted in boldface.

Special Award
Bobby Warans

See also
2017 British Academy Television Awards

References

External links
British Academy Craft Awards official website

British Academy Television Craft Awards
British Academy Television Craft Awards
British Academy Television Craft Awards
British Academy Television Craft Awards
British Academy Television Craft Awards